The 2007 Ashfield District Council election took place on 3 May 2007 to elect members of Ashfield District Council in Nottinghamshire, England. The whole council was up for election and the Labour Party lost overall control of the council to no overall control.

Election result
The results saw Labour lose their majority on the council, after a net loss of 8 seats saw them reduced to 9 councillors. Among the defeated Labour councillors were 2 members of the cabinet, Jessie Parker in Sutton-in-Ashfield North and Stephen Mays in Underwood. There were 12 independent councillors elected, but it was the Liberal Democrats who made big progress, gaining 8 seats to move level with Labour on 9 seats. One of the Liberal Democrat winners, Helen Smith, became one of the youngest councillors in the country at the age of 19 after gaining a seat in Woodhouse ward.

|}

Ward results

References

2007 English local elections
2007
2000s in Nottinghamshire